Luzaga is a village and municipality in the province of Guadalajara, Spain, part of the autonomous community of Castile-La Mancha. Luzaga's Bronze, the most significant known example of Celtiberian script, was found here.

References

External links
Luzaga Tourism Site

Municipalities in the Province of Guadalajara